The orange-bellied euphonia (Euphonia xanthogaster) is a species of bird in the finch family, Fringillidae. They were formerly considered tanagers (Thraupidae).  It is found in Bolivia, Brazil, Colombia, Ecuador, Guyana, Panama, Peru, and Venezuela.  Its natural habitats are subtropical or tropical moist lowland forest and subtropical or tropical moist montane forest.

The black-throated euphonia ("Euphonia vittata") is now thought to be a hybrid between the orange-bellied euphonia and the chestnut-bellied euphonia.

References

External links
Orange-bellied Euphonia videos on the Internet Bird Collection
Orange-bellied Euphonia photo gallery VIREO Photo-High Res
Photo-Medium Res; Article lachuleta

orange-bellied euphonia
Birds of Colombia
Birds of Venezuela
Birds of Ecuador
Birds of the Amazon Basin
Birds of the Atlantic Forest
Birds of the Peruvian Amazon
Birds of the Bolivian Amazon
orange-bellied euphonia
Taxonomy articles created by Polbot